The  is an annual award presented by the Osaka prefectural government to groups or individuals who have made outstanding contributions to the arts and the improvement and promotion of Osaka's art culture.

Since 2009, it has been presented to one individual or group each year. Prior to 2008, it was divided into five arts and culture subcategories. No prize was awarded in 2008.

Recipients

Osaka Culture Prize

Osaka Arts Prize

Osaka Culture Special Prize

Osaka Arts Special Prize

Osaka Cultural Transmission Prize

References

External links

Japanese awards
Awards established in 1963